Ceracris nigricornis is a species of band-winged grasshopper in the family Acrididae, found in Asia.

Subspecies
These subspecies belong to the species Ceracris nigricornis:
 Ceracris nigricornis laeta (Bolívar, 1914)
 Ceracris nigricornis nigricornis Walker, 1870

References

External links

 

Oedipodinae